The following is a list of megafauna discovered by science since the beginning of the 19th century (with their respective date of discovery). Some of these may have been known to native peoples or reported anecdotally but had not been generally acknowledged as confirmed by the scientific world, until conclusive evidence was obtained for formal studies. In other cases, certain animals were initially considered hoaxes – similar to the initial reception of mounted specimens of the duck-billed platypus Ornithorhynchus anatinus  in late 18th-century Europe.

The definition of megafauna varies, but this list includes some of the more notable examples.

Megafauna believed extinct, but rediscovered

 Burchell's zebra (Equus quagga burchellii), 2004

Megafauna previously unknown from the fossil record

 Western grey kangaroo Macropus fuliginosus (1817)
 Malayan tapir Acrocodia indica (1819)
 Red kangaroo Osphanter rufus (1822)
 Lowland anoa Bubalus depressicornis (1827)
 Mountain tapir Tapirus pinchaque (1829)
 Baird's tapir Tapirus bairdii (1865)
 Bonobo Pan paniscus (1928)
 Kouprey Bos sauveli (1937)
 Kabomani tapir Tapirus kabomani (2013)

Megafauna initially believed to have been fictitious or hoaxes

 Przewalski's horse Equus ferus przewalskii (1881 - current wild population descended from zoo breeding since 1945)
 Okapi Okapia johnstoni (1901)

Status unclear 

 Sumatran muntjac Muntiacus montanus (1918)
 Giant peccary Pecari maximus (2007)

See also 
 Mammalia
 List of mammals described in the 2000s

References

Megafauna